Jorge Santana is the first solo album by Mexican guitarist and former Malo member Jorge Santana, released in 1978. The backing up features former Malo members, as vocalist Richard Bean. Jorge Santana is also the brother of guitarist Carlos Santana.

It was reissued in 2003, featuring a new track listing, omitting "Seychells", but featuring two songs remixes.

Jorge Santana charted #54 at Black Albums chart, featuring Richard Bean's "Love The Way" as a single.

Track listing 
All songs by Jorge Santana, except where noted.

Original LP
 "Love You, Love You" – 5:02
 "We Were There" – 3:58
 "Love the Way" (Richard Bean) – 7:18
 "Sandy" – 4:42
 "Seychells" – 4:31
 "Nobody's Perfect"
 "Tonight You're Mine" – 4:53
 "Darling I Love You" – 4:22
Album covers stated this to be the running order, but the actual album running order was as on the remastered CD.

Remastered CD

 "Sandy" – 4:45
 "Tonight You're Mine" – 4:45
 "Darling I Love You" – 4:53
 "We Were There" – 4:22
 "Love You, Love You" – 5:02
 "Love The Way" (Richard Bean) – 7:19
 "Oh! Tengo Suerte" – 5:32
 "Nobody's Perfect" – 4:31
 "Darling I Love You (Dance Mix)" – 6:48
 "Sandy (Dance Mix)" – 7:06

Personnel 

Jorge Santana: Guitars, vocals.
Richard Bean: vocals.
Carlos Roberto: Bass guitar, backing vocals.
Kincaid Miller: keyboards, electric piano, Hammond organ.
Jerry Marshall: Drums, Percussion.
Yogi Newman: Percussion.

Production 

Bob Clearmountain: Producer, engineer.
Tony Bongiovi: Producer.
Lance Quinn: Producer.
Neil Dorfsman: Assistant engineer.
Raymond Willhard: Assistant engineer.
Milton Glaser: Cover Design.
John Kacere: Artwork.

Charts
Album – Billboard (US)

Single – Billboard (US)

1978 debut albums
Albums produced by Bob Clearmountain
Albums produced by Tony Bongiovi
Albums with cover art by Milton Glaser